Patrick Ranch House may refer to:

Patrick Ranch House (Chico, California), listed on the National Register of Historic Places in Butte County, California
Patrick Rancheria, Chico, California, listed on the National Register of Historic Places listings in Butte County, California
Patrick Ranch House (Reno, Nevada), listed on the National Register of Historic Places in Washoe County, Nevada